Cathay Pacific City, often referred as Cathay City, is the headquarters of Cathay Pacific, Hong Kong's flag-carrying airline. It is located at Hong Kong International Airport, on the south side.

History
The airline built Cathay Pacific City so that all central employees could work in one location.

The facility was initially to cost $3.5 billion Hong Kong dollars (US$452.8 million as of 1995). In 1995 the Provisional Airport Authority (PAA) agreed to lease the site to the airline.

The headquarters opened in 1998. The topping out ceremony was held on 17 February 1998. Cathay Pacific City was scheduled to be built in increments between April and September 1998. It was scheduled to open in July, when Hong Kong International Airport at Chek Lap Kok was to open. It was scheduled to have over 3,000 employees. The airline's move to the centre was scheduled to begin in June. On 6 July, operational departments were scheduled to be ready for the airport. In the second half of 1998 the rest of the airline was scheduled to move in. Previously the airline's headquarters were at Swire House, a building in Central named after the airline's parent company. The architects were Llewelyn-Davies, who began design work in May 1995. Simon Jackson and Associates outfitted the hotel interiors. Cathay Pacific City had a cost of 4.9 billion Hong Kong dollars.

Facility
Cathay Pacific City has  of space and is one of the largest corporate head office facilities in Asia.

Cathay Pacific City includes three 10-storey office buildings, a 23-storey staff hotel, a flight training centre with a safety training school, a workshop and storage building, a leisure centre, and an airline stores building. The centre has a  steel pedestrian bridge.

The head office of Air Hong Kong, as of 2004, is located on the fourth floor of the South Tower of Cathay Pacific City. In February 2012, FlightSafety International and Gulfstream Aerospace, in a venture with Cathay Pacific, opened a learning centre for pilots of Gulfstream 450 and Gulfstream 550 aircraft at Cathay Pacific City. The centre is not marked with the FlightSafety name.

The main gallery of the museum chronicles the airline's early history. The second gallery focuses on the airline's development. The third gallery explains the development into the contemporary airline.

To access Cathay Pacific City employees are required to show electronic passes.

Public transport
From Hong Kong city centre via MTR to:

 Tung Chung - then take the Long Win Bus route S64 from Tung Chung station. The second stop is Cathay Pacific City.
 Airport - via Airport Express (from Hong Kong, Kowloon or Tsing Yi stations) - when reaching the airport, or if already at the airport: Take the HAS crew shuttle to Cathay Pacific City from the Terminal 1 Ground Transportation Centre.

See also

 CAL Park (China Airlines head office in Taoyuan, Taiwan)
 Waterside (building) (British Airways head office in London)
 SAS Frösundavik Office Building

Notes

References
 Cairns, Robert. "Cathay City: Hong Kong International Airport." Asian Architect and Contractor. May 1998. Volume 27, Start page 62.
 Excellence in Exhibit Plus Event Design. Visual Reference Publications. 1 February 2010. , 9781584711216.
 Tam, Angela. "Cathay Pacific City." Asian Architect and Contractor. July 1999. Volume 28, Start Page 13.

External links
 

Hong Kong International Airport
Buildings and structures in Hong Kong
Cathay Pacific
Office buildings completed in 1998
1998 establishments in Hong Kong
Airline headquarters